Acacia subracemosa, also known as western karri wattle, is a shrub of the genus Acacia and the subgenus Pulchellae that is endemic to a small area of south western Australia

Description
The leaves are composed of three to six pairs of pinnae. It blooms from September to November and produces cream-yellow flowers.

Distribution
It is native to an area in the South West  region of Western Australia where it is found growing in sandy soils over and around limestone. The range of the plant extends from near Witchcliffe in the north and around Augusta with the bulk of the population located to the west of Karridale usually as a part of Eucalyptus diversicolor (karri) forest communities.

See also
 List of Acacia species

References

subracemosa
Acacias of Western Australia
Taxa named by Bruce Maslin
Plants described in 1975